Vallis Rheita is a linear valley on the near side of the Moon. It is located in the southeastern quadrant, and is oriented radially to Mare Nectaris. This valley appears to share a common origin with the Vallis Snellius to the northeast, as both are oriented radially with Mare Nectaris.

The center of the valley lies at selenographic coordinates , and it has a length of 445 km. At its maximum extent this valley has a width of about 30 km, but it narrows to 10 km at the southeastern extreme. It is the second longest such valley on the near side of the Moon, being exceeded only by Vallis Snellius.

Vallis Rheita has been eroded by a series of impacts, and several notable craters lie along the length of this valley. Near the northwestern end is the crater Rheita, for which this formation was named. Further to the southeast is the crater Young, nearly centered across the valley. Next to Young is Young D, also lying across the valley but less distorted by the rift.

Further southeast are the craters Mallet and Reimarus, the later located near the difficult-to-discern terminus. The satellite crater Mallet D, next to Mallet, also overlays part of the valley.

Rheita, Vallis